The Lewis H. Mills House, once located in Portland, Oregon, was listed on the National Register of Historic Places until 2010.

See also
 National Register of Historic Places listings in Multnomah County, Oregon

References

Former National Register of Historic Places in Oregon
Houses on the National Register of Historic Places in Portland, Oregon
Houses completed in 1929
1929 establishments in Oregon